Taghnevan Harps is a football team in Northern Ireland. They are based in Lurgan, County Armagh and they were promoted through the four divisions to play in the Mid-Ulster Football League's First Division. They now only play in the Lurgan Summer League which runs from the start of May to the end of August. 

The club were formed in 2000 by Terry Magee, Stephen Shanks and Seamus Casey and played their first game in March 2001 in a friendly against Lurgan Celtic which they lost 5-1. 

The game saw the club's first goal which was scored by Terry Magee. Their first competitive game was in the charity Summer League in North Lurgan in May 2001. Dessie Fox got the opener in a 4-1 win over Lurgan Rovers. 

The club's first game in Mid Ulster football came in 2002. Barry McCarroll got the opener and Kevin Campbell scored the first hattrick in their Mid Ulster League campaigns in a 6-0 win over Corner FC. 

The club's home ground is on the edge of the Taghnevan Estate at the Gordon Playing Fields in Lurgan. The home colours are green and yellow and the away strip is white and black. 

The club were relegated from the Mid Ulster First Division in the 2010/11 season and pulled out of the Second Division after they had only fulfilled three league games. 

They did however win their first Summer League trophy in September 2011 when goals from Colm Murphy and Dee Murtagh gave the side a 2-0 win over Kilwilke Athletic. 

2013 saw no silverware while a 2-0 defeat to Shankill Celtic in the Quarter-final of the first cup manager Marty Rogers sides have won all the rest of their fixtures by high scorelines which saw revenge in the second cup as the Harps won 3-1 in the final against Shankill with Niall Heaney, John Campbell and Pol Smyth scoring the Taghnevan goals. 

2014 was also the year that the 'Bap Shanks Memorial Cup' changed venue. It was played in Irish League Champions Cliftonvilles Solitude Stadium. Harps beat a Lurgan Summer League Select side 4-2 on penalties after a 3-3 draw. 

The 2015 Summer league saw the Harps side withdraw from the competition. That year back in Solitude they lost the Bap Shanks Memorial Cup to the Summer League Select side on penalties after a 2-2 draw. 

Harps re-entered the 2016 Summer League again under the management of Marty Rogers. Wins over The Meats and North Lurgan Celts Harps played Kilwilke Shamrocks in the final. Also that season Harps retained the Bap Shanks Memorial Cup. For the third year in a row the game ended 2-2 but it was the Taghnevan lads who took the cup on penalties.

External links

Association football clubs established in 2000
Association football clubs in County Armagh
2000 establishments in Ireland